Amphilochidae is a family of amphipod crustaceans, containing the following genera:
Afrogitanopsis G. Karaman, 1980
Amphilochella Schellenberg, 1926
Amphilochoides Sars, 1895
Amphilochopsis Stephensen, 1925
Amphilochus Bate, 1862
Apolochus Hoover & Bousfield, 2001
Cyclotelson Potts, 1915
Gitana Boeck, 1871
Gitanogeiton Stebbing, 1910
Gitanopsilis Rauschert, 1994
Gitanopsis Sars, 1892
Hourstonius Hoover & Bousfield, 2001
Paramphilochoides Lincoln, 1979
Paramphilochus Ishimaru & Ikehara, 1986
Rostrogitanopsis G. Karaman, 1980

References

Gammaridea
Crustacean families